Richard Kimball is an American educator and founder of the nonprofit voter education organization Project Vote Smart.

Richard Kimball may also refer to:
 Richard Kimball (musician) (born 1941), American composer and pianist
 Richard Ian Kimball, professor of history at Brigham Young University 
 Richard H. Kimball, venture capitalist and technology investor

See also
 Dick Kimball, American diver and diving coach
 Richard Kimble, a character from the film and TV series The Fugitive